Duddenhoe End is a small village in the civil parish of Elmdon & Wenden Lofts, in northwest Essex, England, and situated approximately halfway between Royston and Saffron Walden. The village is nearest to Langley, Essex and Arkesden to its south.

Governance

It is located in the local government district of Uttlesford and within the Saffron Walden (UK Parliament constituency).

Village amenities

The village has no shop, but it has a village hall (erected 1931), and a thatched church which was converted from a barn, in the 19th century. The last public house was "The Woodman", which was converted into a house in the late 1990s. 

The roads are barely more than single track, uneven, country roads with passing places.

Duddenhoe End did not have a mains sewerage system until 2005.

Population

The population at the 2011 Census was included in the civil parish of Elmdon & Wenden Lofts.

External links 

Picture of The Hamlet Church, Duddenhoe End
  Website of the Duddenhoe End Village Hall

Villages in Essex
Uttlesford